Kamarusak or Kam Arusak may refer to:
 Kamarusak-e Bala
 Kamarusak-e Pain